Aperture Entertainment is a management/production company founded by Adam Goldworm in March 2009.

History
Aperture Entertainment reps a wide array of writers, directors, and actors including Cory Goodman (Priest, Lore, The Brood, The Last Witch Hunter), Jeremy Passmore (Special, Red Dawn) & Andre Fabrizio (San Andreas 3D The Prince, Nocturne), Tao Ruspoli (Fix), Simon Rumley (Red White & Blue, The Living and the Dead),  Scott Mann (Heist), Steven C. Miller (Escape Plan 2, Marauders), and Jeremy Lott (Man At Arms, Lore).  The company also reps a number of actors including actress/singer Jessica Lowndes (90210, Altitude), actress Alex Essoe ( Starry Eyes).

Aperture Entertainment is currently producing several films including  Vice written by his clients Jeremy Passmore & Andre Fabrizio and starring Bruce Willis, and The Prince also written by Passmore and Fabrizio and starring Bruce Willis, Jason Patric, John Cusack, 50 Cent and Aperture client Jessica Lowndes,  Warner Bros.'s horror action film Lore written by Aperture clients Cory Goodman and Jeremy Lott, based on Ashley Wood's IDW graphic novel Lore starring Dwayne "The Rock" Turner directed by Men in Blacks Barry Sonnenfeld, Summit Entertainment's horror action film The Last Witch Hunter starring  Vin Diesel with Breck Eisner (The Crazies) directing a script written by Aperture client Cory Goodman, MGM's remake of David Cronenberg's body horror classic The Brood and adaptations of cult novel Snuff written by Chuck Palahniuk and My Friend Dahmer written by award winning political cartoonist Derf Backderf based on the teenage life of serial killer Jeffrey Dahmer.

Aperture Entertainment is also actively producing television including Haunted at ABC with Jon Turteltaub (National Treasure) directing and the comedy series Saint James St. James Presents Delirium Cinema at IFC.

Partial film filmographyThe Prince (2014)Vice (2015)The Last Witch Hunter (2014)Lore (2015)Man At Arms (2015)Apocalypse: Undead (2015)The Brood  (2015)Taste (2015)My Friend Dahmer (2015)Snuff (2015)

Partial TV filmographyThe Factory Series (2015)Jackass of All Trades (2014)Nemesis: The Final Case of Eliot Ness'' (2015)

References 

Film production companies of the United States
Entertainment companies based in California
Entertainment companies established in 2009
2009 establishments in California